The 2012 Iron Trail Motors Shoot-Out was held from December 13 to 16 at the Range Recreation and Civic Center in Eveleth, Minnesota as part of the 2012–13 World Curling Tour. Both the men's and women's events were being held in a round robin format. The purse for the men's event was USD$21,500, and the purse for the women's event was USD$12,500. In the men's final, Tyler George won his second title at Curl Mesabi with a win over last year's runner-up Todd Birr, wrapping up the game with a score of 5–1 in five ends. In the women's final, Jessie Kaufman of Alberta won her first title by defeating last year's runner-up Allison Pottinger with a score of 5–2.

The Iron Trail Motors Shoot-Out was the final event in the season in which teams were able to earn qualifying points for the 2013 United States National Curling Championships on the United States' Order of Merit system, which awards spots to the top two finishers on the Order of Merit.

Men

Teams
The teams are listed as follows:

Round-robin standings
Final round-robin standings

Playoffs
The playoffs draw is listed as follows:

Women

Teams
The teams are listed as follows:

Round-robin standings
Final round-robin standings

Playoffs
The playoffs draw is listed as follows:

References

External links

2012 in curling
2012 in American sports
Curling in Minnesota